Dolichoderus sundari is a species of ant in the genus Dolichoderus. Described by Mathew and Tiwari in 2000, the species is endemic to India.

References

Dolichoderus
Hymenoptera of Asia
Insects of India
Insects described in 2000